Suppressor of tumorigenicity protein 7 is a protein that in humans is encoded by the ST7 gene. ST7 orthologs have been identified in all mammals for which complete genome data are available.

Function 

The gene for this product maps to a region on human chromosome 7 identified as an autism-susceptibility locus. Mutation screening of the entire coding region in autistic individuals failed to identify phenotype-specific variants, suggesting that coding mutations for this gene are unlikely to be involved in the etiology of autism. The function of this gene product has not been determined. Transcript variants encoding different isoforms of this protein have been described.

Interactions 

ST7 has been shown to interact with ITGB1BP3 and GNB2L1.

References

Further reading